Vaj may refer to:
Vaj, Isfahan
Vaj (street artist)
 vaj, ISO 639-3 and ISO 639-2 code for Sekele language

See also
 VAG (disambiguation)